William Adam is a Church of England priest. He was appointed Archdeacon of Canterbury in 2022 and had previously been the Deputy Secretary General of the Anglican Communion and ecumenical advisor to the Archbishop of Canterbury.

Education and family
Will Adam was educated at Aylesbury Grammar School and studied theology and English church history at Manchester University. He then attended Westcott House, Cambridge, from where he was sent to the Bossey Ecumenical Institute in Switzerland for six months in 1993. Adam later went on to earn a master’s degree and a doctorate in canon law at Cardiff Law School. His wife, Lindsay Yates is also an Anglican priest and they have three daughters.

Career
Adam was ordained deacon in 1994 and priest in 1995 and served in parishes in the dioceses of Oxford (1994-2002), Ely (2002-2010), and London (2010-2017). While still a curate in 1996, he appeared in a television advertisement for Ford Escort cars, in which the caption stated, "Will Adam has married 14 women since he got his. . . What do you do in yours?", showing him putting on his clerical collar. In 1998, he was a youth delegate to the World Council of Churches Assembly in Harare, Zimbabwe.

In 2017, Adam was appointed the Archbisop of Canterbury's Ecumenical Adviser at Lambeth Palace, while also holding the role of honorary assistant priest in his wife's parish at Compton, West Sussex. In 2019, he was also made director of the Department for Unity, Faith and Order in the Anglican Communion. A further role was co-secretary of the Anglican-Lutheran International Commission on Unity and Mission (ALICUM). In February 2021, he was appointed Deputy Secretary General of the Anglican Communion, based at the Anglican Communion Office (ACO) at Lambeth.

In March 2022, it was announced that Adam would be the next Archdeacon of Canterbury and Residentiary Canon of Canterbury Cathedral, following the departure of the previous incumbent, the Very Reverend Jo Kelly-Moore, who was made Dean of St Albans. He was installed at Canterbury during Evensong on 18 July 2022, but seconded back to the ACO for the Fifteenth Lambeth Conference between 27 July and 7 August 2022.

References

External links

Archdeacons of Canterbury
Alumni of the University of Manchester
Alumni of Westcott House, Cambridge
Year of birth missing (living people)
Living people